Bankovac is a village in Serbia situated in the  municipality of Aleksinac, in the Nišava District. The population of the village is 178 people with Serbs as supermajority according to the 2002 census. According to the 1991 census it had 205 inhabitants.

Name
Before the Second World War, this village was named Beli Breg. After the war, the villagers of the Assembly decided to change the name of the settlement Bankovac (the highest number of families Banković). On the right bank of the South Morava river is the old settlement of Beli Breg and encountered the problem with the mail-all letters, documents, summonses etc. which arrived in the old village; this was the main reason for changing the name of this town.

Demographics
In the village Bankovac live 149 adult inhabitants, and the average age is 42.7 years (42.6 for men and 42.7 for women). The village has 54 households, and the average number of people per household is 3.30.
This village is largely populated by Serbs (according to the census in) and in the last three censuses, there was a decline in population.

Destinations

Near destinations like 
Timacus Minus about 11 km, 
Thermal baths Ribarska about 19 km, 
Headed Kula, about 21 km, 
Mediana about 22 km, 
Thermal baths Niska about 27 km, 
Velika Plana, about 29 km, 
Sokobanja about 25 km, 
Monastery Naupara about 36 km, 
Kuršumlija, about 51 km, 
Monastery Ljubostinja about 64 km, 
Spa breaks about 52 km, 
Žitkovac about 8 km, 
Aleksinac about 12 km, 
Kruševac, about 36 km.

References

Populated places in Nišava District